Coachwhip ray may refer to:
Black-spotted whipray (Himantura astra)
Brown whipray (Himantura toshi)
Honeycomb stingray (Himantura uarnak)
Mangrove whipray (Himantura granulata)